Lithuanian šakotis or baumkuchenas ("tree cake"), Polish sękacz, Belarusian bankucha, German baumkuchen. Šakotis is a Polish, Lithuanian and Belarusian traditional spit cake. It is a cake made of butter, egg whites and yolks, flour, sugar, and cream, cooked on a rotating spit in an oven or over an open fire.

History
The cake became popular in the 19th century in the former territory of the Polish–Lithuanian Commonwealth (1569–1791). Its origins are related to the baumkuchen in German cuisine. The first recipe in the Polish - Lithuanian - Belarusian region was published in Vilnius by Jan Szyttler in 1830 (the culinary book "Kucharz dobrze usposobiony...").  

Its name means "tree cake" due to its distinctive shape  (it is often conical, like a pine tree, and with the drips as branches) and "tree-rings" inside. It is baked in a time- and labor-intensive process, by painting layers of batter onto a rotating spit in a special open oven or over an open fire.

It can be decorated with chocolate and flower ornaments, but it is often served plain. Šakotis is one of the most important desserts in Lithuanian celebrations, especially at weddings or other special occasions such as Easter or Christmas. It was the sweet chosen to represent Lithuania in the Café Europe initiative of the Austrian presidency of the European Union, on Europe Day 2006.

In May 2015, in Druskininkai, Lithuania, the record of the biggest šakotis was broken with  height and  weight.

In 2006, Masurian sękacz was included in the list of traditional products of the Warmian-Masurian Voivodeship in Poland.

In 2019, the bankucha recipe from Porazava was included in the official list of historical and cultural heritage of Belarus. In north-western Belarus, bankucha is known as a wedding cake made of 60 egg yolks.

Other regional varieties

 Austria – Prügelkrapfen
 Belarus – bankucha (derived from the German word Baumkuchen meaning "Tree cake")
 Czech Republic – Trdelnik
 France – Gâteau à la broche
 Germany - Baumkuchen
 Luxembourg – Baamkuch has become a traditional dish served mostly on special occasions, such as weddings, christenings, etc. Yet, the cake is available all year around in certain supermarkets.
 Poland – Sękacz
 Lithuania – Šakotis (known as Bankuchenas, the word is borrowed from German Baumkuchen) is a similar cake also cooked on a spit, normally over an open fire
 Sweden – Spettekaka with the protected geographical indication (PGI) registered by the EU
 Hungary – Kürtőskalács is a similar cake also cooked on a spit
 Slovakia – Skalický trdelník with the protected geographical indication (PGI) registered by the EU
 Turkey – Makara tatlısı is a similar cake also cooked on a spit.
 Indonesia – Spekkoek (kue lapis legit or spekuk） was developed during colonial times in the Dutch East Indies. The firm-textured cake is an Indo (Dutch-Indonesian) version of the European multi-layered spit cake.

Gallery

See also

 Lithuanian cuisine
 Podlaskie cuisine
 List of desserts
 List of Polish desserts
 List of spit-roasted foods

References

Lithuanian desserts
Polish desserts
Belarusian desserts
Spit cakes